Radom is a Polish parliamentary constituency in the Masovian Voivodeship.  It elects nine members of the Sejm.

The district has the number '17' for elections to the Sejm and is named after the city of Radom.  It includes the counties of Białobrzegi, Grójec, Kozienice, Lipsko, Przysucha, Radom, Szydłowiec, and Zwoleń, and the city county of Radom.

List of members

2019-2023

Footnotes

Electoral districts of Poland
Masovian Voivodeship
Radom